The following lists events that happened during 1909 in the Kingdom of Belgium.

Incumbents
Monarch: Leopold II (until 17 December), Albert I (from in 23 December)
Prime Minister: Frans Schollaert

Events
disbanding of the Athletic and Running Club de Bruxelles
disbanding of the Olympia Club de Bruxelles

Publications
 Hippolyte Fierens-Gevaert, Les Primitifs Flamands, volume 1 (Brussels, G. Van Oest)
 Godefroid Kurth, La Cité de Liège au Moyen̂-Age, vol. 1 (Brussels, A. Dewit)
 C. Liebrechts, Congo: Léopoldville, Bolobo, Équateur, 1883-1889 (Brussels)
 Joseph Van den Gheyn, Catalogue des manuscrits de la Bibliothèque royale de Belgique, vol. 9.

Art and architecture
Buildings
 Henri Van Dievoet, Hotel Astoria, Brussels

Births

Deaths

 4 February – Léon Roget (born 1858), colonial officer
 2 September – Louis Delacenserie (born 1838), architect
 3 September – Jean Stecher (born 1820), literary historian
 11 December – Jenny Minne-Dansaert (born 1844), lacemaker
 17 December – Leopold II

References

 
1900s in Belgium
Belgium
Belgium
Years of the 20th century in Belgium